Gospel Church, today known as Kangding Christian Church, is a Protestant church situated on Guangming Road, Kangding, a county-level city in Garzê Tibetan Prefecture, Sichuan Province. First built in 1905, on Yanhe West Road, by China Inland Mission missionaries; the church was relocated to its present location in 1958.

History 

In 1897, five missionaries of the China Inland Mission (CIM), including Cecil Polhill, began work in Kangding (then known as Tatsienlu, Tachienlu, or Dartsedo in Tibetan), making it a base for work in Tibet.

In 1905, James Huston Edgar (1872–1936), an Australian-born New Zealand CIM missionary, arrived in Kangding and established the traditional Sichuanese-style Gospel Church. Apart from a  inscribed with its name Gospel Church ('Gospel Lecture Hall' or 'Lecture Hall for Evangelisation'), the building is hardly distinguished from any Buddhist or Taoist temple at the time.

Two years later (1907), Robert Cunningham (1883–1942), a Scottish ex-gymnast turned missionary, was sent to Kangding by CIM as Edgar's assistant, who was going to serve as the pastor of the church until his death in 1942. 'Even the Archbishop of Canterbury can not dwell in contemplation and prayer day and night', Cunningham introduced some Western games to the Tibetans, tiddlywinks, ludo, halma and snap, the remit is to 'evangelise in an entertaining way'. He also published numerous articles on the study of Khams Tibet in West China Missionary News and Journal of the West China Border Research Society.

After the communist takeover of China in 1949, Christian Churches in China were forced to sever their ties with respective overseas Churches, which has thus led to the merging of Gospel Church into the communist-established Three-Self Patriotic Church. In 1958, the church was relocated to its present location. The old church building was demolished shortly after, in order to support a city construction project.

In 1995, Gospel Church was rebuilt with white bricks in a pseudo-Gothic style, and renamed Kangding Christian Church. It is quite a humble building surrounded by residential blocks. Apart from its gable topped by a cross, the church could be easily overlooked.

See also 
 Christianity in Sichuan
 Christianity in Tibet
 Gospel Church, Guanghan
 Gospel Church, Mianyang
 Gospel Church, Mianzhu
 Roman Catholic Diocese of Kangding

References

External links 
 Rebuilt Kangding Christian Church (photograph by Hou Xiaoyong, 2015) 

20th-century churches in China
Churches completed in the 1900s
Churches completed in the 1990s
Rebuilt churches
Kangding
Kangding
Traditional Chinese architecture
Buildings and structures in the Garzê Tibetan Autonomous Prefecture
Protestantism in Tibet
Three-Self Patriotic Movement
Kangding